Břetislav Dolejší (26 September 1928 – 28 October 2010) was a Czechoslovak football goalkeeper who played for Czechoslovakia in the 1958 FIFA World Cup. He played for Dukla Prague and Slavia Prague.

Death

Břetislav Dolejší died of cancer on 28 October 2010, at the age of 82

References

External links
 
 FIFA profile

1928 births
2010 deaths
Czech footballers
Czechoslovak footballers
Czechoslovakia international footballers
Association football goalkeepers
SK Slavia Prague players
1958 FIFA World Cup players